Naikal  is a village in the southern state of Karnataka, India. It is located in the Shahpur taluka of Yadgir district in Karnataka.

Demographics
 India census, Naikal had a population of 6,050 with 3,010 males and 3,040 females.

See also
 Yadgir

References

External links
 

Villages in Yadgir district